Pr. Alain Hakim (3 May 1961) is a Lebanese politician, previously serving as the Minister of Economy and Trade in Lebanon.

Career 
Prof. Hakim is a member of the Political Bureau and former Head of the International Relations Bureau of Kataeb Party where he also served as President of Business Council from 2011 until 2014.

Prof. Hakim's career in the financial sector started in 1986. He is currently Member of Management Committee at Credit Libanais Group. He is also CEO and board member in several affiliated companies within the same group. In addition, Prof. Hakim is Member of the executive committee of the Higher Council of the Greek Catholic in Lebanon. He is also Vice President of the board of directors of the Greek Community in Lebanon.

He has kept a close relationship with the academic world since 1989 where he is currently a professor at the Faculty of Management as well as a lecturer at the Superior Institute of Banking Studies at Saint Joseph University. He participates in several academic research studies in the business management field.

Prof. Hakim is also a distinguished fellow at New Westminster College, Canada.

Prof. Hakim started his studies at the Lebanese American University he gained a Bachelor of Science in 1986. Then he enrolled in Saint Joseph University in Beirut where he completed his master's degree in business management in 1990, and then a Master in Advanced Studies in Management (MAS) in 1997. Prof. Hakim holds a PhD in Business Management from Saint Joseph University in Beirut.

Prof. Alain Hakim believes that the role of the economy is to benefit the welfare of its citizens through the protection and promotion of their economic and social well-being.

His actions under his mandate as Minister of Economy and Trade revolved around this idea, where he encourages governance, reforms, and transparency aiming at protecting the consumers, creating job opportunities for the youth, thus improving their well-being and their belonging to their country Lebanon.

References

External links
 Alain Hakim , Official site
 Lebanese Kataeb Party, official site 
 Nna-leb.gov.lb 
 Aljoumhouria.com 
 Aljoumhouria.com 
 Economy.gov.lb
 Creditlibanais.com.lb

1961 births
Living people
Saint Joseph University alumni
Lebanese nationalists
Kataeb Party politicians
Lebanese Melkite Greek Catholics
Economy and Trade ministers of Lebanon